Jander Ribeiro Santana (born 8 July 1988), known simply as Jander, is a Brazilian professional footballer who plays as a left back for Brazilian club Frederiquense.

Career statistics

Club

Honours
Moreirense
Taça da Liga: 2016–17

Red Star
Serbian SuperLiga: 2019–20

References

External links

1988 births
Living people
People from Feira de Santana
Brazilian footballers
Association football defenders
Association football midfielders
Association football utility players
Marília Atlético Clube players
Esporte Clube Juventude players
S.C. Olhanense players
Gil Vicente F.C. players
C.D. Aves players
Moreirense F.C. players
Apollon Limassol FC players
Pafos FC players
Red Star Belgrade footballers
Associação Atlética Internacional (Limeira) players
Xanthi F.C. players
Serbian SuperLiga players
Primeira Liga players
Liga Portugal 2 players
Cypriot First Division players
Brazilian expatriate footballers
Expatriate footballers in Portugal
Expatriate footballers in Cyprus
Expatriate footballers in Serbia
Expatriate footballers in Greece
Brazilian expatriate sportspeople in Portugal
Brazilian expatriate sportspeople in Cyprus
Brazilian expatriate sportspeople in Serbia
Brazilian expatriate sportspeople in Greece
Sportspeople from Bahia